The Dannielynn Hope Marshall Birkhead paternity case, a.k.a. Birkhead v. Marshall, centered on a child born September 7, 2006 to Vickie Lynn Marshall (better known as Anna Nicole Smith). The child was named Dannielynn, and was registered on her birth certificate as the daughter of Vickie Lynn Marshall (Smith) and her live-in partner Howard K. Stern. Larry Birkhead, Smith's former love interest and photographer, steadfastly maintained his contention that he was the baby's father and filed a lawsuit to challenge paternity after Smith had given birth.

Besides Birkhead and Stern, bodyguard/actor Alexander Denk, Mark Hatten and Frédéric Prinz von Anhalt, among others, claimed to be the father of Smith's daughter, Dannielynn. Although Stern was listed on her birth certificate, it was not certain that he was the father. At issue in a California court was who fathered the child, who could potentially inherit millions of dollars from Smith's estate. On September 26, 2006, Stern claimed in an interview from the Bahamas with Larry King on CNN that he was the father of Smith's newborn daughter.

After much media attention, on April 10, 2007, Michael Baird, who analyzed the results of a March 21 DNA test, announced the results that confirmed Birkhead to be the father of the baby.

Name changes 
A  copy of the baby's disputed second birth certificate dated October 11, 2006 was  made public showing she was renamed and registered as Dannielynn Hope Marshall Stern on October 9, 2006. From September 7, 2006 to October 11, 2006 the baby was in the records as Hannah Rose Marshall Stern. After the birth of her daughter, according to G. Ben Thompson, a former boyfriend of hers who is a real-estate developer in South Carolina, Smith wanted to put him down as the father on the birth certificate, but he refused.  Thompson also was not convinced the baby was his because he had a vasectomy. Although Stern is named as the father on the earlier certificate, a Bahamian attorney signed his name where Stern's signature should have been. This discrepancy made the birth certificate invalid so that it could be possible for a new birth certificate to be asked for and a DNA test sought to determine the father's identity. In April 2007 following the official results of the paternity test, Birkhead changed his daughter's surname to his last name, renaming her Dannielynn Hope Marshall Birkhead.

Paternity case and burial proceedings 

On February 21, 2007 hearings commenced in Broward County Circuit court in Florida over the disposition of Anna Nicole Smith's remains. Larry Birkhead petitioned the court to ask Howard K. Stern to submit to a DNA test on February 20, 2007, but at the time Stern stated he was not willing to do so in a closed conference with Judge Larry Seidlin. The judge had put off the paternity question until after the issue of the location of Anna’s burial was decided.
Judge Seidlin awarded custody of Smith's body to lawyer, the guardian ad litem for Dannielynn. Judge Seidlin declared that Smith should be buried in the Bahamas next to her late son.
At the request of Smith's mother, Virgie Arthur, a Bahamian judge issued a temporary injunction preventing Stern from taking Smith's daughter out of the Bahamas. A Florida Appeals court had suspended a lower court ruling that would have allowed Smith's burial in the Bahamas. The Fourth District Court of Appeals in Florida, granted an emergency petition  by Smith's mother to stop a court appointed guardian for Smith's daughter from taking the body to the Bahamas. 

In March 2007, Smith was buried in the Bahamas next to her late son Daniel Wayne Smith after Virgie Arthur lost an appeal against Judge Seidlin's ruling.

Paternity claims

Larry Birkhead 
Birkhead was a freelance celebrity photographer in Los Angeles, California. When the question came up, Birkhead denied receiving money for media interviews, though he has received royalties for archived pictures he took of Smith.

According to Birkhead's testimony on February 10, 2007 while on the stand he and Smith dated on and off from August 2005 to February 2006.

Howard K. Stern 
Stern was Smith's attorney who was named executor of her will which was drafted in 2001 by Eric James Lund, Esq. During the case, Stern denied that he had received money from media interviews he has conducted since Smith's death, though he admitted that he gave an interview to Entertainment Tonight on a flight that the show chartered immediately after her death.
 As a lawyer of Smith's in the continuing litigation over the estate of her late husband, billionaire J. Howard Marshall, he would be entitled to a contingent fee of roughly $5 million, five percent of any money she was awarded.

He claimed to be the biological father of baby Dannielynn Hope Marshall Stern. Following the death of the baby's half-brother Daniel Wayne Smith, Smith put his name on the disputed second birth certificate issued for the baby then known as Hannah Rose.

Frédéric Prinz von Anhalt 
Frédéric Prinz von Anhalt, the husband of Zsa Zsa  Gabor at the time, claimed that he had Smith as a mistress for 10 years. He was quoted as saying that he could potentially be the father of Smith's daughter and said he would file a lawsuit if Dannielynn was turned over to Stern or Birkhead by the courts. According to the Associated Press, on February 12, 2007 Prinz von Anhalt announced that he would file a paternity claim and that his marriage likely would be over if his claims of parentage prevailed. On February 15, 2007, he filed legal documents at a courthouse in Santa Monica, California seeking a DNA test to determine if he was the father of the baby.

On February 20, 2007, he took a lie detector test in his attorney's office in Los Angeles. Prinz von Anhalt passed three lie detector tests that week, according to his attorney. The tests included questions about whether he had an affair with Smith and whether he could possibly be the child's father. On March 23, 2007, he submitted a DNA sample to a Los Angeles clinic even though he was not involved in the paternity suit between Stern and Birkhead. He did not have a sample of the baby's DNA to analyze against, nor did he have a court order to submit to testing, but had stated that he wanted to be prepared if his paternity case had continued. On April 10, 2007 after the paternity test results were made public, representatives of Prinz von Anhalt released this statement wishing Birkhead well with raising the baby: "We never intended to take Dannielynn from anyone, we were just here in case Prinz von Anhalt was the father. We wish Larry luck in raising Dannielynn and we wish him the best."

Potential paternity

Alexander Denk 
Denk is an Austrian-American film actor and was the personal bodyguard of Anna Nicole Smith until her death on February 8, 2007.

Denk, according to his attorney in a joint television interview, also said that he was Smith's confidant, worked for her as her personal trainer, and also was her bodyguard and chef. Denk is also friends with Stern. In the interview with Julie Banderas, Denk said he and Smith were in a relationship and that he knew her for five and a half years. He added that they were intimate on and off for five years.

He reportedly told the entertainment news show Extra that he had an affair with his former employer and that it was possible he could be the baby's father. On the show he claimed he and Smith had a passionate love affair that lasted for two years and that Smith suffered from life-threatening seizures, for which she was on medication. When asked if Smith ever revealed to him the identity of her daughter's father, Denk responded, "She always told me she wanted to have her kids with me." Denk was not certain he was the baby's father and told Banderas that Smith "always told me I want you to be there and care for Dannielynn no matter what, no matter who is the father, because I took care of Anna with her health and everything, and she wanted to make sure her baby is healthy. And also this thing about the dieting and stuff, she doesn't want her baby to be overweight and obese. She wants to make sure she is healthy."

J. Howard Marshall 
J. Howard Marshall II, also deceased, was Smith's second husband.  In February 2007, the New York Daily News claimed to have seen an unpublished manuscript by Donna Hogan, Smith's younger half-sister, saying that Smith had become pregnant by Marshall: "To her family, she hinted that she had used the old man's frozen sperm, and would be giving birth to Marshall's child".

Paternity case results 
On April 10, 2007, Dr. Michael Baird, who analyzed the results of a March 21 DNA test, announced the results outside the Bahamian courthouse that Birkhead is confirmed at 99.99% to be the father of the baby.
Although DNA tests revealed Birkhead is the father, final custody of the baby remained unresolved. "I hate to be the one to say this but...I told you so," Birkhead told reporters and tourists waiting outside the courthouse in Nassau after a judge ruled behind closed doors that he was the biological father of Dannielynn Hope Marshall Stern, who was born on the island September 7. Larry Birkhead announced that he was the father of Dannielynn, Anna Nicole Smith's baby. Stern says he will not contest Birkhead for sole custody and wants a smooth transition for the baby.

See also 
 Family law
 Paternity fraud

Footnotes 

2007 in United States case law
United States district court cases
Trials in the United States
Family law
Trials regarding custody of children
Paternity in the United States
Anna Nicole Smith